The 2018–19 Miami hurricanes women's basketball team represented the University of Miami during the 2018–19 NCAA Division I women's basketball season. The Hurricanes, led by fourteenth-year head coach Katie Meier, play their home games at the Watsco Center and were members of the Atlantic Coast Conference. They finished the season 25–9, 10–6 in ACC play to finish in a tie for third place. They lost in the quarterfinals of the ACC women's tournament to Syracuse. They received an at-large bid of the NCAA women's tournament where they defeated Florida Gulf Coast in the first round before losing to Arizona State in the second round.

Previous season
For the 2017–18 season, the Hurricanes finished 21–11 overall and 10–6, 7th in the ACC.  Miami was eliminated in the quarterfinals of the ACC tournament by Florida State. The Hurricanes received an at-large bid to the NCAA tournament as an eight-seed, their fourth consecutive tournament appearance, and were upset in the first round of the tournament by Quinnipiac.

Off-season

Recruiting Class

Source:

Roster

Schedule

|-
!colspan=9 style="background:#005030; color:#F47321;"| Exhibition

|-
!colspan=9 style="background:#005030; color:#F47321;"| Non-conference regular season

|-
!colspan=9 style="background:#005030; color:#F47321;"| ACC regular season

|-
!colspan=9 style="background:#005030; color:#F47321;"| ACC Women's Tournament

|-
!colspan=9 style=| NCAA Women's Tournament

Source

Rankings

The Coaches Poll releases a final poll after the NCAA tournament, but the AP Poll does not release a poll at this time.

References

Miami Hurricanes women's basketball seasons
Miami
Miami